Trinity School at River Ridge is a private Christian school in Eagan, Minnesota, United States. It provides an education rooted in classical Christian education to students in grades 6-12. The school is located at 601 River Ridge Parkway, Suite 200, in Eagan, Minnesota 55121, this 1996, 2008, and 2019 Blue Ribbon school is accredited by North Central Association and Independent School Association of the Central States (NCA/ISACS).

The River Ridge campus was founded in 1987 by the People of Praise, a Christian community. It is owned and operated by Trinity Schools, Inc, based in South Bend, Indiana. The River Ridge campus has two sister schools, Greenlawn in South Bend and Meadow View in Falls Church, Virginia.

History
River Ridge, the second campus of Trinity Schools, Inc., opened in the Twin Cities in 1987 with 6 teachers and 31 students, using rented facilities at Gethsemane Episcopal Church, in downtown Minneapolis, MN. Dan Ferris served as head of school. In 1991 the school moved from its downtown Minneapolis site to Bloomington, Minnesota, after purchasing a building (itself a former school) from Control Data Corporation. In 1991, when William Wacker became headmaster, the school had grown to 112 students and 18 teachers. The school expanded to two sections of boys and two of girls in 1995, starting with grade 7. In December, 2007, the River Ridge campus relocated to a new campus in Eagan, Minnesota. Jon Balsbaugh became head of school in Fall, 2009. In 2017, Jon Balsbaugh succeeded Dr Kerry Koller as President of Trinity Schools, Inc. In Fall, 2016, the school added a 6th grade. Steve Hendrickson, a long-serving member of the faculty and Dean of Boys, took on the position of head of school in Winter, 2023.

The 2007 move
In 2005, runway expansion at the Minneapolis-Saint Paul International Airport resulted in noise levels greater than 65 decibels on the River Ridge campus in Bloomington. The Metropolitan Airports Commission offered a grant to Trinity School of approximately $7M either to install soundproofing or to help in a move to a new location. Trinity School accepted the grant and selected a new site in Eagan, a nearby suburb, near the intersection of Argenta Trail and Interstate 494. The board of governors of the People of Praise authorized a fund-raising campaign and approved a construction plan for the new campus, which included offices, classrooms, science labs, a commons area, a two-station gym and soccer field. Groundbreaking at the new site occurred at ceremonies on October 19, 2006. The move from the Bloomington campus to the Eagan campus took place in December, 2007, after construction was completed on schedule.

Administration
Mr. Steve Hendrickson is the Head of the School. Mr. Patrick Murphy is the Academic 
Dean and Associate Head of School. Mrs. Peters is the Dean of Girls and Associate Head of School, and Mr. Jakob Olson is the Dean of Boys.

References

External links
 Trinity Schools web site

Christian schools in Minnesota
Classical Christian schools
Eagan, Minnesota
Educational institutions established in 1987
Private high schools in Minnesota
Private middle schools in Minnesota
Schools in Dakota County, Minnesota
Trinity Schools
People of Praise
1987 establishments in Minnesota